Mapplethorpe is a 2018 American biographical drama film written and directed by Ondi Timoner. Shooting began on July 11, 2017 in New York and lasted only 19 days. It premiered at the 2018 Tribeca Film Festival.

Premise
Details the life of photographer Robert Mapplethorpe through his career up until his death in 1989.

Cast
 Matt Smith as Robert Mapplethorpe
 McKinley Belcher III as Milton Moore
 Carolyn McCormick as Joan Mapplethorpe
 John Benjamin Hickey as Sam Wagstaff
 Tina Benko as Sandy Daley
 Brian Stokes Mitchell as Father Stack
 Marianne Rendón as Patti Smith
 Kerry Butler as Holly Solomon
 Thomas Philip O'Neill as David Croland
 John Bolton as Harold Jones
 Karan Oberoi as Emilio Acquavella
 Logan Smith as Young Robert
 Mark Moses as Harry Mapplethorpe
 Brandon Sklenar as Edward Mapplethorpe
 Jason Lopez as Tom Baril
 Anthony Michael Lopez as Jack Fritscher
 Hari Nef as Tinkerbelle
 Martin Axon as Martin Axon
 Mickey O'Hagan as Tina Summerlin

Reception 
Mapplethorpe has received six Audience Awards at Tribeca Film Festival, Sidewalk Film Festival, All Genders Lifestyles and Identities Film Festival, Key West Film Festival, Long Beach Q Film Festival, Oslo/Fusion International Film Festival, Out on Film Atlanta Film Festival, and Best LGBTQ Film at Key West Int'l Film Festival, Best Director at Long Beach Int'l Film Festival, Best Feature Film and Best Director at the Queen Palm International Film Festival and Best Feature Film and Best Director at the Hollywood Women's Film Festival.

Releases 
A director's cut was released in April 2021 with "restored scenes depicting Mapplethorpe’s childhood love of photography, his embattled relationship with his father, and his lingering, ambivalent connection to the Catholic faith".

References

External links
 
 
 
 
 
 

2018 films
2018 biographical drama films
2018 drama films
2018 LGBT-related films
American biographical drama films
American LGBT-related films
Biographical films about photographers
Films scored by Marcelo Zarvos
Films set in the 20th century
Films shot in New York City
LGBT-related drama films
Biographical films about LGBT people
Samuel Goldwyn Films films
2010s English-language films
2010s American films